Patrick Joseph McGinnis (March 17, 1927 – November 15, 1990) was a Republican member of the Pennsylvania House of Representatives.

References

Republican Party members of the Pennsylvania House of Representatives
1927 births
1990 deaths
20th-century American politicians